William Allen Robertson (October 22, 1837 – October 26, 1899) was President of the Louisiana State Senate and Acting Lieutenant Governor for two and a half months in 1881. He was born in Connecticut in 1837.

Political career
Robertson was a state senator representing St. Landry Parish. During the 1876 presidential election, Robertson, a prominent supporter of Democratic nominee Samuel J. Tilden, was accused of offering a bribe of $200,000 to federal election officials to fraudulently deliver Louisiana's electoral votes for the Democrats.

Robertson was serving as President of the Senate when Governor Louis A. Wiltz died in 1881.  Lieutenant Governor Samuel D. McEnery assumed the Governorship and Robertson became the Acting Lieutenant Governor.  He was removed as President of the Senate and Acting Lieutenant Governor by a vote of that body on Dec. 24, 1881 and was replaced by Senator George L. Walton.

Robertson was not reelected to the Louisiana Senate in 1884.

He died at his home in 1889. He is buried in Metairie Cemetery.

References

Lieutenant Governors of Louisiana
Democratic Party Louisiana state senators
Place of birth missing
Place of death missing
1837 births
1889 deaths
19th-century American politicians
People from South Windsor, Connecticut
People from Washington, Louisiana